An unusually prolific and very destructive late-winter tornado outbreak resulted in significant damage and numerous casualties across the southern and eastern half of the United States between February 23–24, 2016. Lasting over a day and a half, the outbreak produced a total of 61 tornadoes across eleven states, which ranked it as one of the largest February tornado outbreaks in the United States on record, with only the 2008 Super Tuesday tornado outbreak having recorded more. In addition, it was also one of the largest winter tornado outbreaks overall as well. The most significant and intense tornadoes of the event were four EF3 tornadoes that struck southeastern Louisiana, Pensacola, Florida, Evergreen, Virginia, and Tappahannock, Virginia. Tornadoes were also reported in other places like Texas, Florida, and Pennsylvania. Severe thunderstorms, hail and gusty winds were also felt in the Northeastern United States and Mid-Atlantic states on February 24 as well.

In addition to the outbreak, non-tornadic impacts were felt in the Midwest, where the storm system produced blizzard conditions and cold temperatures in places including Illinois, Indiana, Michigan, and even parts of southern Ontario in Canada.

Meteorological synopsis 

On February 23, a low pressure area developed near the east end of Texas and began to track northeastwards. The Storm Prediction Center issued a moderate risk for severe weather across parts of Louisiana, Mississippi, Alabama, Georgia, and the Florida Panhandle, including a 15% risk area for tornadoes. The first significant tornadoes of the outbreak moved across southeastern Louisiana and southern Mississippi that evening, leaving significant damage and three deaths. The towns of Livingston and Laplace, Louisiana sustained heavy damage from strong EF2 tornadoes, and another EF2 tornado near Purvis, Mississippi killed one person in a mobile home. An EF3 tornado also caused major structural damage in Paincourtville, Louisiana before destroying an RV park near Convent, killing two people at that location. Three simultaneous waterspouts were observed over Lake Pontchartrain during the event as well. Later that night, a large supercell thunderstorm developed over the Gulf of Mexico and moved ashore, producing a destructive EF3 tornado in Pensacola, Florida. The tornado injured three people and destroyed homes, townhouses, apartments, and a GE warehouse.

Overnight into the early hours of February 24, the low-pressure area moved into the Mid-Atlantic States. With conditions continuing to favor widespread severe weather, the Storm Prediction center issued another moderate risk for Far South-Central Virginia and Central North Carolina in their 0600 UTC update, although it was originally because of a 45% hatched area of damaging winds. At the 1300 UTC outlook, however, that was omitted and replaced with another 15% hatched risk area for tornadoes across Southeastern Virginia and Eastern North Carolina. Strong tornadoes impacted the East Coast states of Virginia, Pennsylvania, and North Carolina on February 24, killing four people. An EF1 tornado struck the town of Waverly, Virginia, killing three people in a mobile home. An EF3 tornado struck the town of Evergreen, Virginia, causing severe damage and killing one person at that location. An EF2 tornado caused major damage to homes near Oxford, North Carolina, and another EF2 tornado touched down near White Horse, Lancaster County, Pennsylvania, damaging up to 50 structures in the area. Another EF3 tornado occurred later that night near the Virginia town of Tappahannock, destroying multiple homes along its path. About 35,000 people in Virginia, 4,000 in Washington, D.C., and 47,000 in the Carolinas lost power due to the storms. Seven people in total were killed by tornadoes during the outbreak, and a total of 61 tornadoes were confirmed.

Confirmed tornadoes

February 23 event

February 24 event

Paincourtville–Convent, Louisiana

This damaging rain-wrapped wedge tornado first touched down at 3:21 p.m. CST (19:21 UTC) on February 23 just southwest of Paincourtville, Louisiana in the parish of Assumption, and almost immediately intensified to high-end EF2 strength as it entered Paincourtville. Significant damage was observed to many residential and business structures in the northern portions of the town, across the intersections of LA 1, 308, and 70. A hardware store was largely destroyed, the town's water tower was toppled to the ground, a two-story apartment building was heavily damaged, and multiple frame and manufactured homes sustained severe damage, some of which were shifted off of their foundations. Multiple large trees were stripped and denuded in this area, industrial buildings sustained major damage, and a tractor trailer was flipped over. Many other homes sustained minor to moderate damage as well. Slightly further along the path, the tornado crossed Gus Caballero Road and Sweethome Road. Low-end EF3 damage occurred in this area as the second floor of a large, well-built brick home was completely destroyed. Wind speeds at this location were estimated at 140 mph (225 km/h), and two small frame homes nearby were completely swept from their pier foundations and destroyed with the debris strewn downwind. The tornado then exited the Paincourtville area and produced EF1 damage as it continued to the northeast. A total of 45 structures were destroyed and 44 others were damaged in Assumption Parish.

The tornado then crossed over the Mississippi River and continued at EF2 strength as it tracked into the parish of Saint James. The tornado ripped directly through the Sugar Hill RV park near Convent with devastating results. Numerous camper trailers were tossed in all directions and destroyed at this location, along with multiple vehicles. Two people were killed at this park and around 75–80 were injured, some critically. Multiple homes and a public housing complex also sustained major damage in the Convent area, and at least 25 homes were heavily damaged or destroyed in St. James Parish. The tornado began to shrink in size as it tracked further northeast, snapping and uprooting more trees and branches, before crossing Louisiana Highway 3125. The tornado began weakening and eventually lifted around 3:42 p.m. CST (19:42 UTC) just after it crossed U.S. Highway 61 (Airline Highway).

Pensacola, Florida

A significant tornado caused EF3 damage in populated areas of northeastern Pensacola during the evening hours of February 23. The tornado first touched down at 8:10 pm CST, southwest of SR 742 and immediately strengthened to EF2 intensity. Several homes lost their roofs along Lansing Drive, and multiple trees and power poles were snapped. With their original warning on the storm set to expire at 8:15 pm CST and seeing that the rotation on radar had remained intense, the NWS Mobile office issued another PDS tornado warning for South Central Escambia and Southeastern Santa Rosa Counties at 8:11 pm CST, again stating that "a large...extremely dangerous and potentially deadly tornado is developing." The tornado then weakened slightly before crossing the concurrent Interstate 10 and SR 8 as well as SR 289, inflicting EF1 damage to several hardwood trees. The tornado then strengthened back to EF2 intensity as it moved through multiple neighborhoods, where many trees and power lines were downed,multiple homes had their roofs torn off, and some sustained some loss of exterior walls. Two cars were also overturned along Tradewinds Drive. After this point, the tornado further intensified to EF3 strength. Major structural damage was inflicted to the Mooring Apartments on Old Spanish Trail Road, with 24 units being destroyed. The second floor of the apartment building was almost totally destroyed, with the roof ripped off and many walls collapsed. Some damage to exterior walls was also noted on the first floor, and six other units were damaged as well. The tornado then reached its peak intensity of mid-range EF3 as it impacted a GE plant, completely destroying a warehouse with some of the debris from the structure being found on the western shoreline of Escambia Bay in Santa Rosa County. Farther to the northeast along the shore of the Escambia Bay, the tornado continued to produce EF3 damage as two townhouses along the concurrent US 90 and SR 10A were completely leveled, with others in the area suffering damage as well. The townhouses were built on raised wooden stilt foundations. The tornado then moved over Escambia Bay, where multiple vehicles were flipped and wrecked on the I-10 bridge. This included an 18-wheeler that overturned. The tornado then abruptly weakened before moving ashore in Avalon Beach in Santa Rosa County at EF1 intensity. The tornado then damaged multiple trees and homes near San Juan Street at Sealark Lane. It continued through the residential area, causing additional EF1 tree and minor home damage before lifting near Shetland Circle just west of Avalon Boulevard at 8:21 pm CST east-northeast of Mulat. However, a debris ball was still present on radar, prompting the NWS Mobile to put out a more strongly worded update that stated that "a confirmed large and extremely dangerous tornado" was in progress while cancelling the warning for Escambia County at 8:23 pm CDT, two minutes after the tornado had lifted. The warning was eventually allowed to expire without any further updates at 8:45 pm CST.

Three people were injured and damages were estimated at $22.075 million (2016 USD). It would be the last tornado of at least EF3 intensity in Florida for over 6 years, before a deadly, nighttime EF3 tornado killed two people in Alford on March 31, 2022.

Chap–Evergreen, Virginia

This strong EF3 stovepipe tornado first touched down at 3:27 p.m. EDT (20:27 UTC) near the northern end of Campbell County, initially producing EF0 damage as it downed several trees. It then crossed into Appomattox County shortly thereafter, before reaching EF2 strength near Chap, where a church sustained collapse of its brick facade and had most of its roof torn off, a frail home lost its roof and exterior walls, and a manufactured home sustained minor damage. Further to the northeast, EF1 damage occurred as many trees were snapped or uprooted and a small home was heavily damaged. Another home further along the path sustained EF1 roof damage before the tornado began to re-intensify. EF2 damage occurred near the intersection of Cedar Bend Road and Club Creek Road, where a poorly constructed home was destroyed. Other homes in the area were damaged to a lesser extent. The tornado then strengthened further as it struck Evergreen, where one home was leveled at EF3 strength and other surrounding homes were heavily damaged. Some outbuildings and manufactured homes were obliterated as well, with large amounts of debris strewn through fields in the area. Evergreen Methodist Church sustained significant roof damage, and one fatality occurred in town as a man was killed in the destruction of his manufactured home. Massive tree damage was observed in the Evergreen area, with large swaths of trees in heavily forested areas snapped, uprooted, and denuded. Past Evergreen, the tornado weakened to EF1 strength, downing additional trees and damaging an outbuilding as it continued to the northeast. Beyond this point, the tornado briefly strengthened back to EF2 intensity and ripped the roof off of a house. The tornado then entered Holliday Lake State Park, snapping and uprooting many additional trees at EF1 strength before lifting and dissipating. Seven people were injured, and the tornado was the first February F3/EF3 tornado in Virginia since 1950.

Dunbrooke–Tappahannock–Naylors Beach, Virginia/White Point Beach, Maryland

This long-lived and destructive EF3 tornado initially touched down at 6:34 p.m. EDT (23:34 UTC) on Homlestown Road to the north of Bruington. It produced high-end EF1 damage as it moved to the northeast and passed just west of Miller's Tavern. Multiple homes sustained considerable damage in this area, one of which was destroyed. Three poorly constructed frame homes, two double-wide mobile homes, and one double wide mobile home were all completely swept away and destroyed. The tornado then passed west of Tappahannock as a high-end EF2, causing major tree damage, destroying outbuildings, and severely damaging homes. It then crossed over the Rappahannock River shortly thereafter. Entering Richmond County as an EF2, the tornado caused major damage to the second floor of a two-story home as well as destroying several other smaller homes nearby as it impacted Naylors Beach directly. Past Naylors Beach, it weakened to a low-end EF1 before re-intensifying to high-end EF1 strength as it entered Westmoreland County and crossed Route 3. The tornado destroyed a mobile home while severely damaging two other homes in this area. Nearing Mount Holly, the EF1 tornado continued damaging multiple homes and uprooted several trees before crossing the Potomac River into the state of Maryland. The tornado weakened and shrunk in size, and as it moved onshore, it uprooted some trees in the White Point Beach area before lifting at 7:14 p.m. EDT (00:14 UTC on February 25) In total, at least 25 people were injured and the tornado caused at least US$10 million in damages.

Non-tornadic impacts
On the back side of the low-pressure area that brought the tornado outbreak along it cold front, some cold air began to interact with the moisture being drawn northward producing heavy snow and ice in parts of the Ohio Valley. At the same time, ahead of the cold front, severe thunderstorms developed ahead of it, which would eventually lead to the tornado outbreak. A truck flipped over on the George Washington Bridge due to  winds on February 24 at 9:15pm. Wind gusts in Larchmont, New York reached , while Bloomingdale, New Jersey recorded  of rain.

See also
List of North American tornadoes and tornado outbreaks
Tornado outbreak and blizzard of April 13–15, 2018
Tornado outbreak sequence of March 24–28, 2021

Notes

References

Tornadoes of 2016
2016 natural disasters in the United States
F3 tornadoes
Tornadoes in Alabama
Tornadoes in Florida
Tornadoes in Georgia (U.S. state)
Tornadoes in Louisiana
Tornadoes in Mississippi
Tornadoes in North Carolina
Tornadoes in Pennsylvania
Tornadoes in Texas
Tornadoes in Virginia
Tornadoes in Maryland
February 2016 events in the United States
Natural disasters in Virginia
Natural disasters in Florida
Natural disasters in Indiana
Natural disasters in Maine